Vattaro is a comune (municipality) in Trentino in the northern Italian region Trentino-Alto Adige/Südtirol, located about  southeast of Trento.

Vattaro borders the following municipalities: Bosentino, Calceranica al Lago, Centa San Nicolò and Besenello.

Demographic evolution

Notable people 
 Luigi "Gigi" Weiss (born 1951), biathlete and ski mountaineer

References

Cities and towns in Trentino-Alto Adige/Südtirol